India competed at the 1992 Winter Olympics in Albertville, France.

Nanak Chand and Lal Chuni both competed in the Men's Slalom and Giant Slalom events in Alpine Skiing.

Competitors
The following is the list of number of competitors in the Games.

Alpine skiing

Men

References

Official Olympic Reports
Olympics-Reference.com

Nations at the 1992 Winter Olympics
1992